The Scorpion: Live at the Cadillac Club is a live album by jazz saxophonist Lou Donaldson recorded in Newark, New Jersey in 1970 for the Blue Note label featuring a performance by Donaldson with Fred Ballard, Leon Spencer, Melvin Sparks, and Idris Muhammad.

The album was awarded 2 stars in an Allmusic review by Scott Yanow who states "The repertoire is dominated by lengthy funk grooves that are quite danceable but never develop beyond the obvious".

Track listing
All compositions by Lou Donaldson except as indicated
 "The Scorpion" (Leon Spencer) - 10:47  
 "Laura" (Johnny Mercer, David Raksin) - 5:55  
 "Alligator Boogaloo" - 13:15  
 "The Masquerade Is Over" (Herb Magidson, Allie Wrubel) - 4:15  
 "Peepin'" (Lonnie Smith) - 5:30 Bonus track on CD  
 "Footpattin' Time" aka "Jump Up" - 6:50 Bonus track on CD 
Recorded at the Cadillac Club, Newark, NJ on November 7, 1970.

Personnel
Lou Donaldson - alto saxophone
Fred Ballard - trumpet
Leon Spencer - organ
Melvin Sparks - guitar
Idris Muhammad - drums

References

Albums produced by Francis Wolff
Lou Donaldson live albums
1995 live albums
Blue Note Records live albums